The Irish America Hall of Fame was founded by Irish America magazine in November 2010. It recognizes extraordinary figures in the Irish American community who have had a profound effect on the Irish in America and strengthened the bonds between the United States and Ireland.

The Irish America Hall of Fame is the centerpiece of the Dunbrody (2001) Famine Ship's new Emigration History Visitor Center in New Ross, Co. Wexford. It was developed in collaboration with publishers Niall O'Dowd and Patricia Harty of Irish America Magazine. The exhibition celebrates the lives, works, and achievements of noted Irish individuals such as: President John F. Kennedy and the Kennedys, Henry Ford, Donald Keough, and President Clinton.

Honorees

2010 Inductees
Donald Keough : Chairman of the Board of Allen & Company Inc.; Former president, COO, and a director of The Coca-Cola Company — Inducted November 2010

2011 Inductees
Dr. Kevin Cahill : Medical Doctor and Chief Medical Advisor for Counterterrorism — Inducted March 2011

Bill Clinton : 42nd President of the United States — Inducted March 2011

Mary Higgins Clark : World-renowned author of suspense novels — Inducted March 2011

Charles Feeney : Entrepreneur, Philanthropist, and Humanitarian — Inducted March 2011

Michael Flatley : Lord of the Dance — Inducted March 2011

William Flynn: President and CEO of the Mutual America and chairman of the National Committee on American Foreign Policy — Inducted March 2011

Denis P. Kelleher : Founder, chairman and CEO of Wall Street Access — Inducted March 2011

Jean Kennedy Smith : American diplomat, former United States Ambassador to Ireland, founder of Very Special Arts — Inducted March 2011

James D. Watson : Nobel Prize winner for mapping the structure of DNA — Inducted March 2011

Maureen O'Hara : Irish actress and legend of the American silver screen — Inducted July 2011 

Bill Ford, Jr. : Executive chairman of Ford Motor Company — Inducted December 2011

2012 Inductees
Loretta Brennan Glucksman : Advocate for Ireland — Inducted March 2012

Ray Kelly : New York City Police Commissioner — Inducted March 2012

John Lahey : President of Quinnipiac University — Inducted March 2012

Tom Moran : Chairman, president, and CEO of Mutual of America — Inducted March 2012

Kevin Roche : Architect — Inducted March 2012

2013 Inductees
Joe Biden : Vice President of the United States — Inducted March 2013 and addressed immigration reform in his keynote speech.

Brian P. Burns : Chairman of BF Enterprises, Inc. — Inducted March 2013

Robert M. Devlin : Chairman of Curragh Capital Partners — Inducted March 2013

John Fitzpatrick : President and CEO of Fitzpatrick Hotel Group, North America — Inducted March 2013

Bruce Morrison : Former U.S. Congressman and head of Morrison Public Affairs Advocacy Group — Inducted March 2013

2014 Inductees

Christine Kinealy: author and founding director of the Ireland's Great Hunger Institute at Quinnipiac University

2015 Inductees
Hillary Clinton : Politician - Inducted March 16, 2015 

Robert J. "Bob" McCann: CEO of UBS Group Americas and Wealth Management Americas

Patrick Quinn: creator of the Ice Bucket Challenge, which has raised over $100 million in donations for ALS research

2016 Inductees
 President Bill Clinton: Lifetime Achievement award "in recognition of his extraordinary role in bringing peace to Northern Ireland."
 Eileen Collins: Astronaut, NASA's first female space shuttle commander 
 General Martin Dempsey: former chairman of the Joint Chiefs of Staff 
 Pete Hamill: novelist, essayist, and journalist 
 Edward J.T. Kenny: special consultant at Mutual of America.

References

External links 
 Irish America magazine at Irish Central.com
 Irish Independent article on President Clinton's speech at the 2011 Hall of Fame event